Luteimonas vadosa is  aerobic, Gram-negative, yellow-pigmented, nonmotile, rod-shaped bacterium. Its type strain is KMM 9005(T) ( = NRIC 0881(T) = JCM 18392(T)).

References

Further reading
Whitman, William B., et al., eds. Bergey’s Manual® of Systematic Bacteriology. Vol. 2. Springer, 2012.

External links
LPSN
Type strain of Luteimonas vadosa at BacDive -  the Bacterial Diversity Metadatabase

Xanthomonadales
Gram-negative bacteria
Bacteria described in 2013